ABC Afterschool Special is an American television anthology series that aired on ABC from October 4, 1972, to January 23, 1997, usually in the late afternoon on weekdays. Most episodes were dramatically presented situations, often controversial, of interest to children and teenagers. Several episodes were either in animated form or presented as documentaries. Topics included illiteracy, substance abuse and teenage pregnancy. The series won 51 Daytime Emmy Awards during its 25-year run.

In 2004 and 2005, BCI Eclipse and Sunset Home Visual Entertainment issued six DVD collections of episodes from the series that had been produced by Martin Tahse, each collection containing four episodes. A boxed set, in the shape of a school bus, was also released containing all of the DVD releases, with a detailed information booklet of all the specials on the set and including an extra DVD of two specials that had previously not been released on DVD.

Episodes

Season 1 (1972–73)

Season 2 (1973–74)

Season 3 (1974–75)

Season 4 (1975–76)

Season 5 (1976–77)

Season 6 (1977–78)

Season 7 (1978–79)

Season 8 (1979–80)

Season 9 (1980–81)

Season 10 (1981–82)

Season 11 (1982–83)

Season 12 (1983–84)

Season 13 (1984–85)

Season 14 (1985–86)

Season 15 (1986–87)

Season 16 (1987–88)

Season 17 (1988–89)

Season 18 (1989–90)

Season 19 (1990–91)

Season 20 (1991–92)

Season 21 (1992–93)

Season 22 (1993–94)

Season 23 (1994–95)

Season 24 (1995–96)

Season 25 (1996–97)

Notes

Reception
In 1993, TV Guide named the series the best kids' show of the 1980s.

See also
 ABC Weekend Special
 The ABC Saturday Superstar Movie
 After school special
 CBS Schoolbreak Special
 Special Treat

References

External links

1972 American television series debuts
1997 American television series endings
1970s American anthology television series
1980s American anthology television series
1990s American anthology television series
1970s American children's television series
1980s American children's television series
1990s American children's television series
American Broadcasting Company original programming
American television series with live action and animation
English-language television shows
Peabody Award-winning television programs
Television series about teenagers